Philip Kemi (born March 2, 1991) is a Swedish professional ice hockey defenceman who currently plays for Luleå HF of the Elitserien.

External links
 

1991 births
Living people
Luleå HF players
Swedish ice hockey defencemen